Almy may refer to:

Almy, Wyoming, a ghost town
CM Almy, American clothing company

People:
Israel T. Almy (1892–1963), American architect
John J. Almy (1815–1895), U.S. Navy Rear-Admiral
Mary Almy (1883–1967), American architect
Max Almy (born 1948), American artist
Susan Almy (born 1946), American politician

See also
Almy Formation, a geological formation in Wyoming
Almay, a cosmetics brand